Francis Godolphin Osborne, 1st Baron Godolphin (18 October 1777 – 15 February 1850), styled Lord Francis Osborne from 1789 to 1832, was a British politician.

Background
Osborne was the second son of Francis Osborne, 5th Duke of Leeds and his wife, Amelia. His grandmother was Lady Mary Godolphin, daughter of the 2nd Earl of Godolphin, who had married the 4th Duke of Leeds.

Political career
Osborne sat as Member of Parliament for Helston between 1799 and 1802, for Lewes between 1802 and 1806 and for Cambridgeshire between 1810 and 1831. On 14 May 1832 he was raised to the peerage as Baron Godolphin, of Farnham Royal in the County of Buckingham.

Family

Lord Godolphin married the Honourable Elizabeth Charlotte Eden, third daughter of William Eden, 1st Baron Auckland, on 31 March 1800. They had five children:

 The Hon. George Godolphin Osborne (1802–1872); later 2nd Baron Godolphin, 8th Duke of Leeds from 1859 to 1872
 The Hon. William Godolphin Osborne (1804–1888). William traveled in 1836 to India with his cousins George Eden, 1st Earl of Auckland, later Governor General of India; Emily Eden, the travel writer ; and Fanny Eden. While there, William wrote and illustrated his 1840 travel narrative The Camp and Court of Runjeet Sing: With an Introductory Sketch of the Origin and Rise of the Sikh State. In 1843, upon his return to Britain, William married the daughter of famed abolitionist and Cornish MP Matthew Montagu the 4th Baron Rokeby. William's wife was Hon. Caroline Montague. They had no children. His second wife was Georgiana Henrietta Child-Villiers, daughter of Admiral George Keith Villiers Elphinstone, 1st Viscount Keith.
 The Hon. Sidney Godolphin Osborne (1808–1889); became a religious minister. He was the grandfather of the 12th (and last) Duke of Leeds. Known for his letters to The Times signed S.G.O. as well as for his work during the Crimean War with Florence Nightingale and for his advocating for famine victims in the west of Ireland during the Great Irish Famine (1845–1853). See Osborne's Gleanings in the West of Ireland published in 1850 and his Scutari and its Hospitals published in 1855. Sidney married the sister of Pascoe Grenfell. Under Sidney's auspices, he arranged for his close friends Charles Kingsley and James Anthony Froude to marry his wife's two sisters. Kingsley memorializes the Grenfell sisters in his 1848 novel Yeast A Problem.
 The Hon. D'Arcy Godolphin Osborne (1814–1846).
 The Hon. Charlotte Godolphin Osborne (d. 1838); married Sir Theodore Brinckman, 1st Baronet, becoming Lady Brinckman.

The 8th Duke's surviving siblings, William and Sydney, were granted the rank of a younger son of a duke in 1859, becoming Lord William Osborne and Lord Sydney Osborne respectively. This is because their father, Lord Godolphin, would have inherited the dukedom had he not died in 1850; nine years prior to the death of the 7th Duke of Leeds. On Lord Godolphin's death in 1850, his title of Baron Godolphin passed to his eldest son, George, who became the 2nd Baron Godolphin. George later inherited the dukedom of Leeds from his cousin in 1859.

External links

References

Burke's Peerage & Gentry, 107th edition

Barons in the Peerage of the United Kingdom
Osborne, Francis
Younger sons of dukes
1777 births
1850 deaths
Osborne, Francis
Osborne, Francis
Osborne, Francis
Osborne, Francis
Osborne, Francis
Osborne, Francis
Osborne, Francis
Osborne, Francis
Osborne, Francis
Osborne, Francis
Osborne, Francis
Osborne, Francis
Osborne, Francis
Francis
Peers of the United Kingdom created by William IV